Biotin-dependent malonate decarboxylase (malonate decarboxylase (with biotin), malonate decarboxylase) is an enzyme with systematic name malonate carboxy-lyase (biotin-dependent). This enzyme catalyses the following chemical reaction

 malonate + H+  acetate + CO2

Two types of malonate decarboxylase are currently known, both of which form multienzyme complexes.

References

External links 
 

EC 4.1.1